The year 1869 in archaeology involved some significant events.

Explorations

Excavations
 Temple of Artemis at Ephesus discovered by British archaeologist John Turtle Wood near Kuşadası, Turkey.
 Near Miamisburg, Ohio, the site of Miamisburg Mound is partially excavated, when a vertical shaft is sunk from the top to the base, with two horizontal tunnels extending from it.

Finds
 Waldalgesheim chariot burial.

Births
 March 30 - Aleš Hrdlička, Czech-born anthropologist (d. 1943)
 April 23 - Percy Newberry, English archaeologist (d. 1949)
 April 30 - John Kirk, English physician, Roman archaeologist and physical anthropologist (d. 1940)
 July 3 - John Myres, English archaeologist of Cyprus (d. 1954)
 September 24 - Maud Cunnington, British archaeologist (d. 1951)

Deaths
 August 8 - Roger Fenton, photographer (b. 1819)

See also
 Egyptology

References

Archaeology
Archaeology by year
Archaeology
Archaeology